FAW-Volkswagen Automobile Co., Ltd. is a joint venture between FAW Group and Volkswagen Group which manufactures Audi and Volkswagen marque passenger cars for sale in China. It was founded on 6 February 1991.

FAW-VW is headquartered in the south-western fringes of Changchun, Jilin Province, where it also has two vehicle assembly plants. It has an additional assembly plant in Chengdu, Sichuan Province, and a fourth plant is under construction in Foshan, Guangdong Province. FAW-VW is capable of producing the cars based on the platforms of PQ34, PQ35 and PQ46.

FAW-VW's year-on-year production volume exceeded 513,000 units as of 31 July 2009.

History

1980s
Audi AG began a contract on August 13, 1988 with First Automobile Works to produce the Audi 100 for the Chinese market. The 100 was assembled with imported parts from Germany.

1990s
On November 20, 1990, the official contract of an annual capacity of 150,000 cars for the joint venture between FAW Group (First Automotive Works Group) and Volkswagen AG was signed by Geng Zhaojie (耿昭杰), President of FAW and Dr. Carl Hahn, CEO of Volkswagen AG in the Great Hall of the People, Beijing. All of the facilities in the first car plant, including the body shop, paint shop and assembly shop came together from the abandoned factory of VW's in Westmoreland, USA. The company started its business officially on September 1, 1992.

On December 5, 1991, the first Volkswagen Jetta Mk2 rolled off the line. Two years later, on February 7, 1993, the 10,000th car rolled off the line.

In 1995 FAW Group, Volkswagen AG and Audi AG decided to integrate Audi to the product line of the joint ventures, the equity holdings were also changed with 60% for FAW, 30% for VW and 10% Audi.

On May 20, 1996, the first Audi 200 rolled off the line.

On July 10, 1996, the engine shop started running  as well as full scale production.

By July 1996, the company was capable of producing 150,000 cars, 270,000 engines and 180,000 gearboxes in one year.

In 1997 FAW-Volkswagen Sales Company Ltd. was established as a joint venture between FAW-VW and FAW Group with the equity holdings of 50% for each, it was a smart idea of avoiding the Germans to take control of the sales department under the policy of the governing body then. By 2002 FAW-VW took the majority of the equities back from FAW Group.

In 1998 the Jetta King became the first car ever equipped with ABS system in the Chinese A-class market.

In 1999 the Jetta was registered in FIA Group N category, it entered a lot of Rally events in China with FRD Sport and Qingyang Racing from the late 1990s to early 2000s.

2000s
In 2002 the Jetta became the first mass production passenger car in China to be available with a diesel engine.

On January 7, 2004, the 1,000,000 car (a Bora A4) rolled off the line.

On December 7, 2004, FAW-VW's second car plant began operating.

On August 4, 2009, the 3,000,000th car (a Golf A6) rolled off the line in car plant #2.

2010s
By 2010 FAW-VW had sold over 1,000,000 Audis (including imported cars) in China. With the celebration, a sculpture named 'Ode to Audi' from Gerry Judah was set at the entrance of the company.

According to Chinese government policy, foreign auto manufactures should develop domestic brands with their local partners. Thus FAW-VW revealed its own brand 'Kaili (开利)' in May 2011.

On August 15, 2011, FAW-VW celebrated its twentieth anniversary with its one millionth car in 2011 (a Magotan B7L).

On March 26, 2019, FAW-VW launched new Jetta sub-brand, with three new vehicles: Jetta VA3, VS5 and VS7. While VA3 is a rebadge of VW Jetta in China, both SUV models, VS5 and VS7, are rebadges of SEAT models. The sales is scheduled to start in the third quarter of this year. All Jetta models are assembled at the Chengdu plant.

Leadership

Automobile production started in December 1991, and the current manufactured range includes:

Current products (Audi; Changchun plant)

Current products (Audi; Foshan plant)

Current products (Audi; Qingdao plant)

Current products (Audi; Tianjin plant)

Current products (Volkswagen; Changchun plant)

Current products (Jetta marque; all cars are assembled at the Chengdu plant)

Current products (Volkswagen; Chengdu plant)

Current products (Volkswagen; Foshan plant)

Current products (Volkswagen; Qingdao plant)

Current products (Volkswagen; Tianjin plant)

Former products (Audi)

Former products (Volkswagen)

Current powertrain range
EA390 2.5T VR6 engine
EA888 2.0T L4 engine
EA211 1.4T & 1.5L L4 engine
MQ200 5-speed MT
AQ160 & AQ250 6-speed AT
DQ200 & DQ381 & DQ500 7-speed DSG

Sales
The following figures including VWs and Audis made by FAW-VW:

References

External links
FAW Group corporate website 
FAW website  with FAW-VW history 
FAW website  with FAW-VW landmarks 
FAW-Volkswagen 

Car manufacturers of China
Chinese-foreign joint-venture companies
FAW Group
Volkswagen Group